Thori  is a Hindu caste found in the states of Gujarat and Rajasthan in India. They are also use surname as the Chaudhary or Nayak.

Origins
The Thori claim descent from Suryavanshi Rajput. They claim that they held the role of commanders in the army of the various Rajahs of Rajputana.

Present circumstances
They are found mainly in the districts of Ganganagar, and Churu. Their spoken language is Marwari. They are sub-divided into sixteen clans, the main ones being Panwar, Solanki, Chauhan, Tomar, Ranghar, Dagla, Chandela, Dhol, Sodath, Khinchi, Ran, Gor, and Gahlot. They are an endogamous community and maintain clan exogamy.

The Thori are farmers. They work in the industrial and agricultural sector. They have an effective caste council, which acts as quasi-judicial body and deals with intra-community dispute. The Thori are Hindu, with balaji being their main deity.

The Thori of Gujarat are also known as Utloiwala, Batwala and Jhori. They have two endogamous groups, the Makwana and Barasia. Like other Gujarat communities, they have a number of clans, called Ataks. Their main ataks are the Parmar, Makowara, Gatar, Kharkaria, Bhoping, Narodia, and Mangarchi. The community is still mainly involved with the manufacturing of baskets. Their range is northern and central Gujarat, particularly the districts of Ahmadabad, Surendranagar, Sabarkantha, Panchmahal and Baroda. Like the Rajasthan Thori, they speak Mewari.

References

Dalit communities
Scheduled Castes of Delhi
Scheduled Castes of Haryana
Scheduled Castes of Rajasthan
Scheduled Castes of Gujarat